Beast Mode is the fourteenth mixtape by American rapper Future and American producer Zaytoven. It came out on January 15, 2015. Along with Monster and 56 Nights, it is considered part of "a trilogy of album-quality mixtapes" that Future released following Honest. On July 6, 2018, a sequel mixtape titled Beast Mode 2 was released.

Background
Beast Mode came out two and a half months after Monster, six months after his second album Honest, and two days after Ciara released her track, called "I Bet" (which is her first song since the breakup between her and Future). According to Zaytoven, “Really, the work was done in two to three days. The rest was just picking which record we wanted to use. For somebody else to come in and see us doing the work, it would blow your mind....We might’ve gotten 40 songs done as we were putting this tape together. That’s us doing songs back-to-back. I make a beat, he raps to it… And we’d do it all over again. We might do 10 songs a day.”

"Kno The Meaning" (which was taken from DS2) is the song where Future had to elaborate on the impetus behind the project and its origin in DJ Esco's 56-day incarceration in Dubai: "People didn't even understand that my hard drives that I recorded all my music on for two years straight was on this... was on this one hard drive that Esco had and he was locked up with it, so I had to record new music. That's when I did Beast Mode." DJ Esco returned to the USA two days before the release of Beast Mode.

Critical reception

Upon release, Beast Mode was met with critical acclaim. At Metacritic, which assigns a normalized rating out of 100 to reviews from mainstream publications, the mixtape received an average score of 81 based on four reviews, indicating "universal acclaim".

David Amidon of PopMatters wrote, "Not only does the tape constantly satisfy, at nine tracks and less than a half hour it does what nearly every truly fantastic hip-hop album does: it makes its motives known and gets the hell out." Craig Jenkins of Pitchfork praised the mixtape's production and lyrics, writing, "Though he'll only tacitly admit as much, [Future] is hurt, and Beast Modes heavy-hearted sounds assist him in sorting through it just as Monsters menace helped him turn spite to fuel. Claire Lobenfeld of Fact wrote, "[Zaytoven's] ability to bring out some of the fiercest vocals from Atlanta's finest is brought to light here," and that Future "has found [his focus] in Beast Mode – and not just because of its brevity," adding that the project "is a reminder that [Zaytoven] has a deft control over the ivories and southern-fried twinklers."

Track listing

References

2015 mixtape albums
Future (rapper) albums
Zaytoven albums
Albums produced by Zaytoven